Little Shaddox Creek is a  long 1st order tributary to the Cape Fear River in Lee County, North Carolina.  This is the only stream of this name in the United States.

Course
Little Shaddox Creek rises about 3 miles south-southwest of Blacknel, North Carolina and then flows easterly to join the Cape Fear River about 3 miles south of Moncure, North Carolina.

Watershed
Little Shaddox Creek drains  of area, receives about 47.7 in/year of precipitation, has a wetness index of 526.18 and is about 59% forested.

See also
List of rivers of North Carolina

References

Rivers of North Carolina
Rivers of Lee County, North Carolina
Tributaries of the Cape Fear River